Yakov Zheleznyak (born 10 April 1941) is a former Soviet sport shooter and Olympic champion. He won a gold medal in the 50 m Running Target at the 1972 Summer Olympics in Munich.

References

1941 births
Living people
Ukrainian male sport shooters
Soviet male sport shooters
Running target shooters
Olympic shooters of the Soviet Union
Shooters at the 1972 Summer Olympics
Olympic gold medalists for the Soviet Union
Olympic medalists in shooting
Sportspeople from Odesa
Dynamo sports society athletes
Medalists at the 1972 Summer Olympics
K. D. Ushinsky South Ukrainian National Pedagogical University alumni